The Women's tournament of the volleyball competition of the 2011 All-Africa Games was held from September 6–16, 2011 in Maputo.

Teams

Preliminary round

Group A

|}

|}

Group B

|}

|}

Knockout stage

Championship bracket

Semifinals

|}

Third place game

|}

Final

|}

5–8th place bracket

Semifinals

|}

Seventh place game

|}

Fifth place game

|}

See also
Volleyball at the 2011 All-Africa Games – Men's tournament

External links
Results

Volleyball at the 2011 All-Africa Games